The National Dinosaur Museum is Australia's largest permanent display of prehistoric specimens, located in Canberra, Australian Capital Territory, Australia. It is located in Gold Creek Village, an area within the suburb of Nicholls.

The museum's exhibition follows the evolution of life, with a particular focus on dinosaurs.

With an annual patronage of 100,000 visitors, the museum is one of the most popular attractions in the Australian Capital Territory. The gift shop stocks a range of natural history books, dinosaur replicas, toys, fossils, crystals, minerals and meteorites.

Established in 1993, the museum has been steadily improved and updated since its conception. It offers earth science dinosaur oriented  displays that keep up with most recent discoveries in the geological sciences. in September 2011, Jeno Kapitany, Martin Rowe, Chris Michael and Kate Michael were been appointed including local and international scientist and geologist Tom Kapitany. Major upgrades have taken place in April and May 2012 with the addition of twelve animatronic dinosaurs as well as an extensive collection of life size models displayed both within and outside the museum.

The museum caters for guided tours for school groups of all ages by appointment, as well as hosting birthday parties, dance with dinosaurs events for young children, private parties, corporate functions and dinosaur sleep overs during school holiday periods. New displays of Australian dinosaurs, earth sciences including meteorites, fluorescent mineral displays were added over 2012 and 2013.

Opening hours are 10am to 5 pm seven days a week including public holidays, but are closed Christmas Day. After hours visits are available by appointment only .

Gallery

References

External links
National Dinosaur Museum

Museums in the Australian Capital Territory
Dinosaur museums
Museums established in 1994
Natural history museums in Australia
Science education
Fossil museums
Paleontology in Australia
1993 establishments in Australia